Poultry by-product meal (PBM) is a high-protein commodity used as a major component in some pet foods. It is made from grinding clean, rendered  parts of poultry carcasses and can contain bones, offal and undeveloped eggs. Poultry by-product meal quality and composition can change from one batch to another.

References

Pet foods
Meat industry